Poecilasthena glaucosa is a moth in the family Geometridae. It is found in Australia, including Queensland.

References

Moths described in 1888
Poecilasthena
Moths of Australia